Thung Song is a district (amphoe) in the southwestern part of Nakhon Si Thammarat province, southern Thailand.

Geography
Neighboring districts are (from the west clockwise): Bang Khan, Thung Yai, Na Bon, Chang Klang, Lan Saka, Ron Phibun, Chulabhorn, and Cha-uat of Nakhon Si Thammarat province; Huai Yot and Ratsada of Trang province.

Administration
The district is divided into 13 sub-districts (tambons), which are further subdivided into 125 villages (mubans). Thung Song is a town (thesaban mueang) covering tambon Pak Phraek. There are a further 12 tambon administrative organizations (TAO).

Environment
In the 1980s a dam project was conceived to solve the district's drought problem. An environmental impact assessment (EIA) was conducted in 2003 by the Royal Irrigation Department (RID). It was updated in 2009. Nothing further happened until the National Environmental Board (NEB) approved the EIA on 27 May 2016. In December 2019, the Thai cabinet approved the project. Local residents say that the dam is no longer needed, as newer water management infrastructure such as weirs and small check dams have solved drought problems. The site of the dam is now classified as a 1A watershed forest area and locals do not want to see it inundated. The proposed Wang Heeb Dam will cost 2.3 billion baht and will displace 40 families. The RID insists that it must proceed with the project as it has been approved. The government's goal is clear according to one observer: "...maintaining a firm grip on central control and suppressing local forest management efforts which will dilute their power."

See also
List of districts of Thailand
Provinces of Thailand

References

External links
amphoe.com

Districts of Nakhon Si Thammarat province